The Corsican Assembly is the unicameral legislative body of the territorial collectivity of Corsica. After the 2017 territorial elections, the assembly was expanded from 51 to 63 seats, with the executive council expanding from 9 to 11 members (including the president).

History

On 2 March 1982, a law was passed that gave Corsica the status of territorial collectivity, abolishing the Corsican Regional Council which had existed before. Unlike the regional councils, the Corsican Assembly has executive powers over the island.

In 1992, three institutions were formed in the territorial collectivity of Corsica:
 The Executive Council of Corsica, which exercises the type of executive functions held in other French regions by the Presidents of the Regional Councils. It ensures the stability and consistency needed to manage the affairs of the territory;
 The Corsican Assembly, a deliberative, unicameral legislative body with greater powers than the regional councils on the mainland;
 The Economic, Social and Cultural Council of Corsica, an advisory body.

Terminology
Members are now called "Councillors of the Corsican Assembly", or in unofficial and everyday speech, just "Councillors".

Powers
 Economic development
 Taxation
 Energy
 Environment
 Housing
 Education and training
 Language
 Transport
 Forestry and agriculture
 Culture
 Tourism
 Sports & youth

Composition
There are 63 members of the Assembly, elected for a six-year term via a closed party list and two rounds of voting. To pass beyond the first round, a candidate requires an absolute majority, whereas in the second round a plurality is sufficient.

The list that wins in the first or second round automatically obtains three seats as a "premium to the majority". The other seats are distributed based on proportional representation.

At the first meeting of Assembly Councillors after an election, the councillors elect an Assembly President in a plurality ballot. This is also a two round contest, with an absolute majority required to proceed to the second round. At the same time as the election of the President, the Assembly also elects the ten members that will make up the President's Committee.

In contrast to the executives of the regional councils, Assembly Councillors may not also be members of the Corsican Executive Council. Election to the executive requires resignation from the Assembly.

Results

Presidents of the Corsican Assembly
 1974–1979: 
 1979–1982: Jean Filippi
 1982–1984: 
 1984–1998: 
 1998–2004: José Rossi
 2004–2010: Camille de Rocca Serra
 2010–2015: Dominique Bucchini
 2015-2021: Jean-Guy Talamoni
 2021-: Marie-Antoinette Maupertuis

Assembly members
Members since 2015:

See also
 Departmental Council of Corsica
2021 French regional elections

References

External links
 Website of the L'Assemblée de Corse / L'Assemblea di Corsica  (Corsican)

 
Politics of Corsica
Government of Corsica